Stewart Ainsworth  (born 26 June 1951) is a British archaeological investigator who is regularly seen on Time Team the Channel 4 archaeological television series he joined in 1995. He has since appeared in over two hundred episodes.

After reading, in his youth, a book about Horatio Nelson, 1st Viscount Nelson, and visiting the Tower of London, he formed an interest in the history of landscapes.

He trained as a surveyor before entering the archaeology section of the Ordnance Survey. He has worked on a number of archaeological sites in Britain and abroad. He joined the Royal Commission on the Historical Monuments of England (now part of English Heritage) in 1985, and was its Landscape Investigation Team based in York, England.

He was affectionately called Time Team'''s "lumps and bumps" man by Mick Aston, and works with the team alongside his day job, travelling the country surveying, recording and investigating archaeological sites. Regarding Time Team'''s potential return, which was realised in 2022 after an eight-year hiatus, Ainsworth said: "Time Team has probably been one of the biggest things that has happened to archaeology for many years – to make archaeology and history accessible, and we need to keep that profile going whatever way we can."

As of 2010, Ainsworth has been affiliated with the history and archaeology department at the University of Chester, where he is a visiting professor.

He is president of the Friends of Epiacum, also known as Whitley Castle, the Roman fort on the southern edge of Northumberland which he has surveyed and studied in depth.

References

External links
Imagine spending an entire weekend with Time Team's Stewart Ainsworth Learning How to Decode the Landscape

British archaeologists
Living people
1951 births
People from Morley, West Yorkshire
Archaeologists appearing on Time Team
Academics of the University of Chester
People of the Royal Commission on the Historical Monuments of England